Wise Blood is a 1979 black-comedy drama film directed by John Huston and starring Brad Dourif, Dan Shor, Amy Wright, Harry Dean Stanton, and Ned Beatty. It is based on the 1952 novel Wise Blood by Flannery O'Connor. As a co-production with Germany the film was titled Der Ketzer or Die Weisheit des Blutes when released in Germany, and Le Malin when released in France.

Plot
Hazel "Haze" Motes (Brad Dourif) is a 22-year-old veteran of an unspecified war and a preacher of the Church of Truth Without Christ, a religious organization of his own creation, which is against any belief in God, an afterlife, sin, or evil. The protagonist comes across various characters such as teenager Sabbath Lilly Hawks, her grandfather Asa Hawks who is a conventional sidewalk preacher; and a local boy, Enoch Emery, who finds a "new" Jesus at the local museum in the form of the tiny corpse of a shrunken South American Indian. Hoover Shoates is a promoter who wants to manage Hazel's career as a prophet while Hazel's landlady falls in love with him.

After being spurned by Motes, the landlady calls the police and reports him as derelict in paying rent. The police find Motes lying in rubbish in a semi-conscious state, after deliberately blinding himself with lye. They return him to the house where he is placed on a bed in the landlady's custody. She promises him an easy life, in any part of the house he chooses, with her waiting on him full time.

The film ends with the landlady's failed attempts to get a response from the now-completely unresponsive Hazel Motes. 

The director of the film appears in two fantasy sequences as Hazel's grandfather.

Cast
 Brad Dourif as Hazel Motes
 John Huston as Grandfather
 Dan Shor as Enoch Emory
 Mary Nell Santacroce as Landlady
 Harry Dean Stanton as Asa Hawks
 Amy Wright as Sabbath Lily Hawks
 Ned Beatty as Hoover Shoates
 William Hickey as Preacher
 J.L. Parker as Karl
 Marvin Sapp as Raymond
 Betty Lou Groover as Leora Watts

Production
Wise Blood was filmed mostly in and around Macon, Georgia, near O'Connor's home Andalusia in Baldwin County, using many local residents as extras. The original music score was composed by Alex North.

New Line Cinema picked up U.S. distribution of the film after the screening at the Cannes Film Festival. A tsantsa from Mercer University was used in the production and appears in the final film. The tsantsa was repatriated by the university in 2019.

Release
The film premiered out of competition at the 1979 Cannes Film Festival in May 1979. The film was amended—in particular, the soundtrack—and was shown at the New York Film Festival in September and then released in France in October. The film was released for an Academy Awards qualifying run for one week at the Laemmle Royal Theatre in Los Angeles in December before being released in the rest of the United States in February 1980.

Home media
It was released on DVD by the Criterion Collection on May 12, 2009.

Critical reception
At Cannes, the film received a mixed reception. Following its screening at the New York Film Festival, critic Vincent Canby called the film "one of John Huston's most original, most stunning movies. It is so eccentric, so funny, so surprising, and so haunting that it is difficult to believe it is not the first film of some enfant terrible instead of the thirty-third feature by a man who is now in his seventies and whose career has had more highs and lows than a decade of weather maps." Sam Jordison of The Guardian wrote in a retrospective review; "This adaptation is wonderful. It pulls off the rare trick of seeming faithful to the spirit and voice of the book, while being a work of art in its own right."

Marjorie Baumgarten from The Austin Chronicle wrote, "Disturbing and grim in its portraits, Wise Blood is nevertheless marvelous storytelling and its performances are virtually divine." Time Out described the film as "Tragically, desperately funny" and called it "John Huston's best film for many years".

On review aggregator website Rotten Tomatoes, Wise Blood holds a score of 88% based on 24 critic reviews, with an average rating of 7.4 out of 10. The site's critical consensus reads, "Director John Huston and author Flannery O'Connor prove a formidable creative match in Wise Blood, a gothic satire anchored by Brad Dourif's vinegary performance."
On Metacritic, the film has a weighted average score of 84 out of 100 based on 16 critic reviews, indicating "critical acclaim".

In 2003, The New York Times placed the film on its Best 1000 Movies Ever list.

References

External links
 
 
 
 
 

1979 films
1979 comedy-drama films
American comedy-drama films
American independent films
West German films
English-language German films
1970s English-language films
Films scored by Alex North
Films about religion
Films based on American novels
Films directed by John Huston
Films set in the 1970s
Films set in Georgia (U.S. state)
Southern Gothic films
1979 independent films
1970s American films